30th Street and Dolores station is a light rail stop on the Muni Metro J Church line, located in the Bernal Heights neighborhood of San Francisco, California. The stop has no platforms, trains stop at marked poles before the crossing Dolores Street and passengers cross a vehicle travel lanes on 30th Street to board trains. The stop is not accessible to people with disabilities.

History 
The San Francisco and San Mateo Electric Railway (SF&SM), later part of the Market Street Railway system, began operation on April 27, 1892. The line ran on 30th Street between Guerrero Street and Chenery Street. After the 1906 San Francisco earthquake, the URR rerouted the San Mateo line to Mission Street; Embarcadero–Daly City route 26 and Embarcadero–Sunnyside route 10 continued to operate on the ex-SF&SM on Church Street. Service on Church over the former SF&SM route ended on January 27, 1940, when route 10 was discontinued.

J Church and N Judah trains began using an extension of the J Church line along 30th Street and San Jose Avenue for carhouse moves on August 31, 1991. Although these trips were open to passengers, the extension and its stops did not open for full-time service until June 19, 1993.

In March 2014, Muni released details of the proposed implementation of their Transit Effectiveness Project (later rebranded MuniForward), which included a variety of stop changes for the J Church line. Transit bulbs would be added at 30th Street and Dolores so that passengers would no longer have to cross a lane of traffic to board trains. A more limited preliminary project announced in November 2019 will include some modifications to the stop.

References

External links 

SFMTA: 30th St & Dolores St inbound and outbound
SF Bay Transit (unofficial): 30th St & Dolores St

Muni Metro stations
Railway stations in the United States opened in 1991